British rock band Coldplay have released nine studio albums, six live albums, 12 compilation albums, 18 extended plays, 41 singles, 13 promotional singles, and four charity singles. According to Parlophone, their first eight albums have sold a combined total of 100 million copies worldwide as of May 2021, making them the most successful band of the 21st century and one of the best-selling artists of all time. They are also the act with most number-one albums in the United Kingdom without ever missing the top and achieved nine million-selling singles in the country. Additionally, Nielsen SoundScan reported in February 2015 the band have sold over 18.2 million albums and 33.6 million song downloads in the United States.

In 1998, Coldplay independently released Safety, their first extended play. It was succeeded by The Blue Room after they signed with Parlophone in 1999. During the same year, "Brothers & Sisters" debuted at number 92 in the UK Singles Chart. In March 2000, "Shiver" was made available as the lead single for Parachutes. It was their first song to reach the Top 40, being followed by "Yellow", which peaked at number four and is considered the band's breakthrough hit. In July 2000, the album was released to immediate success domestically, in New Zealand and Australia, eventually becoming a sleeper hit in France, Germany, Italy and the United States as well. As of 2020, Parachutes has sold 13 million units worldwide.

The band's second studio album, A Rush of Blood to the Head, was released on 26 August 2002 and experienced much stronger sales in comparison to its predecessor, topping the charts of 11 countries around the world. Coldplay promoted the record with singles "In My Place", "The Scientist" and "Clocks", which have all entered the UK Singles Chart Top 10. Their third studio album, X&Y, was then released on 6 June 2005 upon considerable anticipation, earning the third-biggest sales week of United Kingdom's history at the time, reaching number one in 32 countries, and becoming the year's best-selling record. With 737,000 copies sold, it debuted atop Billboard 200 and remained on region for three weeks, marking the longest stay for a British group since the Beatles between 2000 and 2001. Lead single "Speed of Sound" was an international Top 10 hit as well.

On 12 June 2008, Coldplay released Viva la Vida or Death and All His Friends. It also earned the distinction of being the biggest album of the year worldwide, topping the charts of 36 countries and having the biggest digital sales of the decade. The title track, "Viva la Vida", was their first number-one song in the United Kingdom and United States, as well as the first British group track to achieve the feat since "Wannabe" by the Spice Girls in 1997. The band's fifth studio album, Mylo Xyloto, was then made available on 24 October 2011 and followed the success of its predecessors by going number one in 34 countries, while "Paradise" became the biggest rock song of the year and their second chart-topper in the United Kingdom. According to the International Federation of the Phonographic Industry (IFPI), it was the best-selling album of 2011 by a group.

Coldplay later repeated the achievement on Ghost Stories, which arrived on 19 May 2014. The band's seventh studio album, A Head Full of Dreams, marked the shortest gap between two of their records, being released on 4 December 2015. Although mostly kept from number one around the world by Adele's 25, it had a resurgence in sales following their Super Bowl 50 halftime show performance, eventually selling over six million copies. Its companion piece, Kaleidoscope EP, included a live version of "Something Just Like This", which was the third best-selling song of 2017 worldwide and their most successful single to date. Everyday Life was then released on 22 November 2019, peaking at number one in 12 countries. Two years later, "My Universe" was made available and Coldplay became the first British group in history to debut atop Billboard Hot 100. The band's ninth studio album, Music of the Spheres, arrived on 15 October 2021 and earned the biggest sales week of the year in the United Kingdom upon release.

Albums

Studio albums

Live albums

Compilation albums

Extended plays

Singles

Promotional singles

Charity singles

Other charted and certified songs

Other appearances

See also
 Coldplay videography
 List of songs recorded by Coldplay

Notes

References

External links
 Coldplay Official Website
 Coldplay on AllMusic

Discography
Alternative rock discographies
Discographies of British artists
Pop music group discographies
Rock music group discographies